Peter Steuger (born 6 February 1965) is a German-born cinematographer who has worked mostly on German films after a start in Icelandic cinema. He was nominated for a Golden Frog Award for his cinematography on the acclaimed 2000 Icelandic film 101 Reykjavík.

Mostly, however, he has worked in German television.

Filmography
Ostsee für Sturköppe (AT) (2022)
McLenBurger - 100% Heimat (2021)
Oskar, das Schlitzohr und Fanny Supergirl (2020)
Turkish Ice-Cream (2019)
Papa auf Wolke 7 (2019)
cicero (2018)
Kaisersturz (2017)
Die Ausewählten (2013)
Sir Kan 1711 (2011)
Bloodrop (2011)
Veda-atatürk (2010)
Fata Morgana (2007)
Adem'in trenleri (2007)
Schöner Leben (2006)
Drei gegen Troja (2005) (TV)
The Ring Thing (2004)
Cowgirl (2004)
Der gestohlene Mond (2003) (TV)
Alltag (2003) (TV)
Tatort (1 episode, 2003)
99 Euro Films (2002) (segment "Privat")
Liebe und Verrat (2002) (TV)
Boran (2001)
Doppelter Einsatz (1 episode, 2001)
101 Reykjavík (2000)
The Split (1999)
Zoe (1999/II)
Martin - Das erste Mal (1998)
Parçalanma (1998)

References

External links

German cinematographers
Living people
1965 births